Lukasz Krupadziorow (born 1989) is a Polish heavyweight kickboxer.

Background
Lukasz comes from Augustow, Poland, started training kickboxing in 2012 in Storm Gym Luton. He came to England for work, as he was always interested in martial arts he started training kickboxing regularly.

Kickboxing record

|-  style="background:#fbb;"
| 2019-07-13 || Loss ||align=left| Arnold Oborotov || Kickboxing Grand Prix 22  || London, England || TKO (referee stoppage) || 5 || 3:00
|-
|-  style="background:#fbb;"
| 2017-05-06 || Loss ||align=left| Cătălin Moroșanu || SUPERKOMBAT World Grand Prix II 2017 || Madrid, Spain || Decision (unanimous) || 3 || 3:00
|-
|-  style="background:#cfc;"
| 2017-04-07 || Win ||align=left| Tony Johnson || SUPERKOMBAT World Grand Prix I 2017 || Bucharest, Romania || TKO (Cut) || 1 ||   
|-
|-  style="background:#fbb;"
| 2015-05-16 || Loss ||align=left| Łukasz Parobiec || Super Fight Series: Episode I Cosmic Collision || London, England || KO || 1  || 0:21 
|-
! style=background:white colspan=9 |
|-
|-  style="background:#fbb;"
| 2014-09-23 || Loss ||align=left| Ashwin Balrak || Enfusion 5: Victory of the Vixen, Final || Koh Samui, Thailand || TKO (Low Kicks) ||  ||
|-
! style=background:white colspan=9 |
|-
|-  style="background:#cfc;"
| 2014-09-23 || Win ||align=left| Daniel Sam || Enfusion 5: Victory of the Vixen, Semi Finals || Koh Samui, Thailand || Decision || 3 || 3:00
|-
|-  style="background:#fbb;"
| 2014-03-01 || Loss ||align=left| Dawid Żółtaszek || KTMMA 2  || Manchester, England || KO (Punch) || 1 || 2:36
|-  style="background:#cfc;"
| 2013-11 || Win ||align=left| Tomas Vaikus || KTMMA 1 (2x5)  || Manchester, England || TKO (Referee Stoppage) || 1 || 1:26
|-  style="background:#fbb;"
| 2013-05-19 || Loss||align=left| Correy Robins ||  || Dudley, England || Decision ||  || 
|-
! style=background:white colspan=9 |
|-  style="background:#cfc;"
| 2013-04-14 || Win ||align=left| Ricky Nickolson || Russ Williams Promotions Fight Night  || Wrexham, Wales || RD || 2 || 3:00
|-  style="background:#cfc;"
| 2013-02 || Win ||align=left| Alex Jakubiek ||  || Manchester, England || Decision || 3 || 2:00
|-
! style=background:white colspan=9 |
|-
| colspan=9 | Legend:

See also
List of male kickboxers

References 

Polish male kickboxers
1989 births
Living people
People from Augustów
SUPERKOMBAT kickboxers